The Pan American Table Tennis Championships is a table tennis tournament for countries in the Americas. It was first held in 2017 in Cartagena de Indias, Colombia. The tournament is a joint effort of the Latin American Table Tennis Union and the Northern American Table Tennis Union. Since its first edition, the tournament has included seven competitions; namely, men's single, double and team; women's single, double and team; and mixed doubles.

Editions

Winners

Medal table

See also
 Pan American Table Tennis Cup
 Table tennis at the Pan American Games

References

 
Table tennis competitions
Sports competitions in the Americas
Table tennis in Latin America
Table tennis in North America
Table tennis in South America
Recurring sporting events established in 2017